Aglaia soepadmoi is a tree in the family Meliaceae. The tree is named for botanist and editor of Tree Flora of Sabah and Sarawak Engkik Soepadmo. Habitat is forests from sea-level to  altitude. A. soepadmoi is found in Sumatra and Borneo.

References

soepadmoi
Plants described in 2005
Trees of Sumatra
Trees of Borneo